Michael Simanowitz (August 10, 1971 – September 2, 2017) was a Democratic New York State Assembly member from the borough of Queens.

Election to New York State Assembly
Simanowitz was a resident of the Electchester housing cooperative, part of the neighborhood of Flushing in the New York City borough of Queens. He was chief of staff to Nettie Mayersohn, the local assemblywoman for 28 years, and after Mayersohn announced her retirement, Simanowitz was elected in a special election on September 13, 2011, to replace her.

Auxiliary police officer
Simanowitz served on the New York City Police Department Auxiliary Police's 107 Precinct Auxiliary Unit since 1995. For nine years he served as that unit's commanding officer. Simanowitz achieved the rank of Auxiliary Deputy Inspector.

Death
Simanowitz died on September 2, 2017, at the age of 46 after an undisclosed illness.

References

1971 births
2017 deaths
People from Forest Hills, Queens
American Orthodox Jews
Democratic Party members of the New York State Assembly
New York City Police Department officers
People from Flushing, Queens
Queens College, City University of New York alumni
Jewish American state legislators in New York (state)
21st-century American politicians
Politicians from Queens, New York
21st-century American Jews